= Benjamin Gaete =

Benjamin Gaete was a 19th-century Chilean poet, writer, translator and civil servant. He is best remembered for his Castilian verses and period as the General Inspector of the Civil Registry of Chile.

== Early life and writing career ==
Born in Talca, he was educated in the Instituto Nacional. He began producing poetry, which was translated into other languages, appearing in publications such as Revista Chilena, El Sud Améríca and La Época de Santiago. He published Castilian verses in the poem El Intermezzo with the German Heinrich Heine.

== Civil service ==
From 1884 he served as the General Inspector of the Civil Registry of Chile. He became responsible for the distribution of books in Chile. He was still General Inspector of the Civil Registry in 1898.
